Vladek Lacina (born 25 June 1949) is a Czech rower who competed for Czechoslovakia in the 1972 Summer Olympics, in the 1976 Summer Olympics, and in the 1980 Summer Olympics.

He was born in Prague.

In 1972 he and his partner Josef Straka finished sixth in the double sculls event.

Four years later he won the bronze medal with the Czechoslovak boat in the quadruple sculls competition.

At the 1980 Games he finished fourth in the single sculls contest.

References

External links 
 

1949 births
Living people
Czech male rowers
Czechoslovak male rowers
Olympic rowers of Czechoslovakia
Rowers at the 1972 Summer Olympics
Rowers at the 1976 Summer Olympics
Rowers at the 1980 Summer Olympics
Olympic bronze medalists for Czechoslovakia
Olympic medalists in rowing
Medalists at the 1976 Summer Olympics
Rowers from Prague